Park Yun-ha (born April 23, 1991), better known by her stage name Giant Pink, is a South Korean rapper. She was the winner of hip-hop competition show Unpretty Rapstar 3, and she is currently a member of the hip-hop label AIKM (All I Know Music) a sub-label under SM Entertainment.

Personal life 
Giant Pink married a younger businessman in November 2020. On December 6, 2021, she announced that she is pregnant after a year of marriage. On March 16, 2022, Giant Pink gave birth to her first son

Controversy 
In early 2022, Giant Pink's inclusion of verses from the Bhagavad Gita into her song "Pink" caused controversy among Indian fans.

Filmography

Television show

Releases 
 가위 바위 보 (Rock Scissors Paper), with Miryo (2016)
 돈벌이 (Make Money), with Duckbae (2016)
 미인 (Beauty), with Dok2 (Unpretty Rapstar 3, final track) (2016)
 BUB, with MyunDo (Unpretty Rapstar 3 CD) (2016)
 E.G.O, with Boi B and Sanchez (Unpretty Rapstar 3 CD) (2016)
 All I Know Music Cypher with Miryo, Duckbae, and Bray (2016)
 Mirror Mirror (2019)
 Burn Out (2020)
 어때 (Come Closer) (2021)
 Pink (2021)

Collaborations

References

External links 
 
 

1991 births
South Korean women rappers
Mystic Entertainment artists
Living people
Unpretty Rapstar contestants
21st-century South Korean women singers
21st-century South Korean singers
South Korean hip hop record producers